Zbydniów  is a village in the administrative district of Gmina Łapanów, within Bochnia County, Lesser Poland Voivodeship, in southern Poland.

The village has a population of 544.

References

Zbydniów [ˈzbɨdɲuf] is a village in the administrative district of Stalowa Wola, in southeast Poland. Soltys Michal Bednarz nickname Michu

Villages in Bochnia County